The Musée zoologique de la ville de Strasbourg is a natural history museum displaying the zoological collections of the city of Strasbourg, managed and curated by the University of Strasbourg.
The museum is closed since September 2019 and until 2023 for renovation and enlargement.

History
In 1802, the city of Strasbourg purchased all of the natural history collections of Johann Hermann. When the University of Strasbourg was created anew in 1872, the management and curation of the museum was entrusted to it. A spacious new building was erected from 1890 to 1893 and the collection continued to grow.

The museum has collections of birds, marine mammals, invertebrates and insects, with a very particular focus on Alsatian fauna. There is also a reconstruction of Johann Hermann's study, containing many documents and specimens of his time.

Collections 

The collections include:
1,350,000 invertebrates
1,000,000 insects
18,000 birds
10,000 mammals
2,450 fish
1,300 reptiles and amphibians

See also
Ludwig Heinrich Philipp Döderlein

References

Bibliography 
Histoires naturelles : Les collections du Musée Zoologique de la Ville de Strasbourg, Éditions des Musées de la Ville de Strasbourg, February 2008,

External links

 Official website
 Overview of the collections

Stras
Zoologique
Zoology museums
University of Strasbourg
University museums in France